C-type lectin domain family 12 member A is a protein that in humans is encoded by the CLEC12A gene.

This gene encodes a member of the C-type lectin/C-type lectin-like domain (CTL/CTLD) superfamily. Members of this family share a common protein fold and have diverse functions, such as cell adhesion, cell-cell signaling, glycoprotein turnover, and roles in inflammation and immune response. The protein encoded by this gene is a negative regulator of granulocyte and monocyte function. Several alternatively spliced transcript variants of this gene have been described, but the full-length nature of some of these variants has not been determined. This gene is closely linked to other CTL/CTLD superfamily members in the natural killer gene complex region on chromosome 12p13.

CLEC12A, also known as MICL, is inhibitory C-type lectin-like receptor. It contains ITIM motif in cytoplasmic tail that can associate with signaling phosphatases SHP-1 and SHP-2.

There are two types, human (hMICL) and murine (mMICL). Human MICL is expressed as a monomer primarily on myeloid cells, including granulocytes, monocytes, macrophages and dendritic cells.

Murine MICL is expressed as dimer on granulocytes, monocytes but also on B lymphocytes and can be also found on NK cells surface in bone marrow.

Use in therapy
In the immunotherapy of acute myeloid leukemia (AML), CLL-1 becomes one of the target due to its high expression in AML cells while being absent in normal hematopoietic stem cells. CLL-1 is also expressed on the surface of leukemic stem cells (LSC), which possesses the ability to indefinitely self-renew, produce plenty of leukemic cells and are associated with leukemia relapses.

Scientists are working on various therapeutic approaches using CLL-1 as a target for AML. One of them is development of bispecific antibodies such as CD3/CLL-1 antibody. It can recruit unstimulated primary T cells in patients against cancer cells with CLL-1 on surface.

Other way is development of CAR T cells specific for CLL-1 antigen. This principle showed efficient and specific anti-leukemia activity to AML cell lines from AML patients, as well as in mouse model.

References

Further reading

External links 
 

C-type lectins